Admiral Mark Milbanke (12 April 1724 – 9 June 1805) was a British naval officer and colonial governor.

Military career
Milbanke was born into an aristocratic Yorkshire family with naval connections, his father was Sir Ralph Milbanke, 4th Baronet. Mark Milbanke graduated from the Royal Naval Academy, Portsmouth in 1740. He was made Lieutenant in 1744 and in 1746 was given command of HMS Serpent. He became Port Admiral at Plymouth in 1783.

In 1789, Milbanke was appointed governor of Newfoundland. In the years when settlement was prohibited on the Island of Newfoundland, Milbanke did his best to enforce this prohibition. He did so by demolishing buildings, and by limiting the number of Irish people immigrating to Newfoundland. He also refused to allow the building of a Roman Catholic chapel at Ferryland.

He was appointed Commander-in-Chief, Portsmouth in 1799.

Milbanke was promoted to admiral of the white in 1795. In 1805 he fell over the banisters at his home and died from his injuries.

Family
Milbanke married Mary Webber (died 1812); they had a son and two daughters. Ralph (died 1823) was a naval captain. Elizabeth Mary, the younger daughter, married William Huskisson. Harriet, the elder daughter, married Philemon Tilghman, son of James Tilghman.

See also 
 Governors of Newfoundland
 List of people from Newfoundland and Labrador

References

|-

|-

1724 births
1805 deaths
Royal Navy admirals
Governors of Newfoundland Colony